Exodus is a Christian compilation album, featuring various artists of Contemporary Christian Music, such as dc Talk, Jars of Clay, Third Day, and Michael W. Smith.   The album is noted for recreations of two well-known songs: Third Day recreates Michael W. Smith's "Agnus Dei" with a version still played on the radio today, and Michael W. Smith recreates "I See You", a song written by Rich Mullins, and also plays the song on his second worship album, Worship Again.  The album was released on May 16, 1998, and sold in excess of 400,000 copies.

Track listing

References

Contemporary Christian music compilation albums
1998 compilation albums
Christian music compilation albums